The London City Royals were a British professional basketball team, based in the Crystal Palace area of London, England. The team was founded in 2018, however despite big ambitions the team ceased trading less than two years later, during the 2019–20 season.

History
The team was established in July 2018 by businessman Jon Sawyer and London-based basketball promoter Nhamo Shire, founder of the London School of Basketball. Following the withdrawal of Leeds Force earlier in the summer, the Royals became the 12th member of the league and the second London-based franchise along with London Lions, with the Royals being based at Lions' former home venue, the Crystal Palace National Sports Centre.

In its inaugural season, the Royals invested heavily in a playing roster that included Great Britain internationals Matthew Bryan-Amaning and Ashley Hamilton. The team, led by former BBL player Jay Williams, secured their first silverware early in the club's fledgling existence, winning the BBL Trophy after defeating city rivals London Lions 90–82 in the first ever BBL final to be decided after overtime.  Overall, the star-studded team's fortunes were mixed, with a 1st Round Cup exit to lowly Worcester and a 4th-place finish and above-500 record in the league, before losing out comfortably in the Playoff final to Leicester.

The club announced midway through the 2019–20 season it would cease to operate with immediate effect, pending liquidation.

Honours
 BBL Trophy Winners: 2018–19 (1)

Home arena
Crystal Palace National Sports Centre (2018–2020)

Players

Final roster

Notable former players

Season-by-season records

See also
British Basketball League
London Lions
London Towers
Crystal Palace

References

Basketball teams established in 2018
Basketball teams disestablished in 2020
Defunct basketball teams in the United Kingdom
Crystal Palace, London
Basketball teams in London
2018 establishments in England
2020 disestablishments in England
Former British Basketball League teams